This page is a non-exhaustive list of individuals and organisations who endorsed individual candidates for the 2019 Indonesian presidential election. Politicians are noted with their party origin or political affiliation should they come from parties not part of the candidate's coalition. Celebrities are noted with their party origin should they have one. Years of office are accurate during the election day (17 April 2019).

Endorsements for Joko Widodo

Central government

President and vice presidents
 Megawati Sukarnoputri, 5th President of Indonesia (2001–04), 8th Vice President of Indonesia (1999–2001), daughter of 1st President Sukarno
 Gen. (ret.) Try Sutrisno, 6th Vice President of Indonesia (1993–98), former Commander of the Indonesian National Armed Forces (1988–93), former Chief of Staff of the Indonesian Army (1986–88)
 Jusuf Kalla, 10th and 12th Vice President of Indonesia (2004–09, 2014–present), former Coordinating Minister for People's Welfare (2001–04), former Minister of Industry and Trade (1999–2000)

Cabinet-level officers

Members of central parliamentary houses

Independent agencies and commissions officers
 Antasari Azhar, former chair of the Corruption Eradication Commission (2007–09) (Independent)
 , former chair of the General Elections Commission (2016–17) (Independent)

Provincial government

Governors and Vice Governors

Members of provincial parliament
 Prasetyo Edi Marsudi, Speaker of the Jakarta Parliament (2014–present)
 Wanda Hamidah, former Jakarta Parliament member (2009–14), actress

Municipal government

Notable political figures
 Faisal Basri, economist, 2012 Jakarta gubernatorial candidate (Independent)
 Grace Natalie, general chairwoman of the Indonesian Solidarity Party, former news anchor
 Hendra Bambang Wisanggeni, 18th Sultan of Banten (Independent)
 La Nyalla Mattalitti, former general chairman of PSSI (Independent)
 Sukmawati Sukarnoputri, daughter of 1st President Sukarno (Independent)
 Yenny Wahid, daughter of 4th President Abdurrahman Wahid, former director of Wahid Institute (Independent)

Retired military and police personnel

Retired Indonesian Army personnel
 Gen. Fachrul Razi, former Deputy Commander of the Indonesian National Armed Forces (1999–2000)
 Lt. Gen. Lodewijk Freidrich Paulus, former General Commander of the Kopassus (2009–11)
 Maj. Gen. Muchdi Purwopranjono, former General Commander of the Kopassus (1998) (Berkarya)

Retired Indonesian Navy personnel
 Adm. Marsetio, former Chief of Staff of the Indonesian Navy (2012–14)

Retired Indonesian Air Force personnel
 Air Chf Mshl , former Chief of Staff of the Indonesian Air Force (2015–17)

Retired Indonesian National Police personnel
 Pol.
 Pol.
 Pol. Gen. Da'i Bachtiar, former Chief of the Indonesian National Police (2001–05)

Businesspeople
 Erick Thohir, owner of Mahaka Group
 Hary Tanoesoedibjo, owner of MNC Group, general chair of Perindo Party
 Rosan Roeslani, chair of Indonesian Chamber of Commerce and Industry

Celebrities

Religious figures
 Ahmad Muhtadi Dimyathi, Muslim cleric
 , Muslim cleric
 Ahmad Syafi'i Maarif, former general chair of Muhammadiyah (1998–2005)
 Muhammad Luthfi bin Yahya, Muslim cleric
 Muhammad Syahir Alaydrus, Muslim cleric
 Nadirsyah Hosen, chair of Consultative Board of Nahdlatul Ulama special branch in Australia and New Zealand
 Said Aqil Siradj, general executive chairman of Nahdlatul Ulama (2010–present)
 Salim Jindan Baharun, Muslim cleric
 Yusuf Mansur, Muslim cleric

Newspapers, television channels, and other media 
 MetroTV

Endorsements for Prabowo Subianto

Central government

President
 Gen. (Hons.) (ret.) Susilo Bambang Yudhoyono, 6th President of Indonesia (2004–14), former Coordinating Minister for Political and Security Affairs (2001–04, 2000–01 as Coordinating Minister for Political, Social, and Security Affairs), former Minister of Mining and Energy (1999–2000)

Cabinet-level officers

Members of central parliamentary houses

Independent agencies and commissions officers
 , former chair of the Corruption Eradication Commission (2010–11), former chair of Judicial Commission of Indonesia (2005–10)
 Bambang Widjojanto, former vice chair of the Corruption Eradication Commission (2011–15)
 , former National Commission on Human Rights of Indonesia commissioner (2012–17)
 , former National Commission on Human Rights of Indonesia commissioner (2012–17)
 , former National Commission on Human Rights of Indonesia commissioner (2012–17)

Provincial government

Governors and Vice Governors

Members of provincial parliament
 Muhammad Taufik, Deputy Speaker of Jakarta Parliament (2014–present)

Municipal government
 , Mayor of Salatiga (2011–16, 2017–present)
 , Mayor of Banjarmasin (2016–present)
 , Regent of Lebak (2014–present).
 Rudy Gunawan, Regent of Garut (2014–present)
 , Vice Regent of West Bandung (2018–present), actor
 , former Regent of Serang (2005–15)
 Begug Poernomosidi, former Regent of Wonogiri (2000–10)

Notable political figures 
 , daughter of 2nd President Suharto

Retired military and police personnel

Retired Indonesian Army personnel
 Gen. Djoko Santoso, former Commander of the Indonesian National Armed Forces (2007–10)
 Gen. Gatot Nurmantyo, former Commander of the Indonesian National Armed Forces (2015–17)
 Maj. Gen. Sudrajat, former Ambassador of Indonesia to China, 2018 West Java gubernatorial candidate.
 Inf. Maj. Agus Harimurti Yudhoyono, son of 6th President Susilo Bambang Yudhoyono, 2017 Jakarta gubernatorial candidate

Retired Indonesian Air Force personnel
 Air Chf Mshl Imam Sufaat, former Chief of Staff of the Indonesian Air Force (2009–12)

Retired Indonesian National Police personnel 
 Pol. Gen. Insp. (ret.) Sofjan Jacoeb, former chief of Greater Jakarta Metropolitan Regional Police (2001)

Businesspeople
 Hashim Djojohadikusumo, Prabowo's younger brother, Founders Board vice chair of Gerindra

Celebrities

Religious figures
 Aa Gym, Islamic preacher
 Abdul Somad, Islamic preacher
 Bahar bin Smith, Islamic preacher and FPI member
 Haikal Hassan Baras, Islamic preacher
 , Islamic preacher
 Muhammad Rizieq Shihab, leader of Islamic Defenders Front (FPI)
 Tengku Zulkarnain, Islamic preacher, Indonesian Ulema Council deputy secretary-general

References

Presidential elections in Indonesia
Political endorsements